Connected and Respected is a collaborative studio album by Vallejo, California rappers/cousins E-40 and B-Legit of The Click. It was released on April 6, 2018 via Heavy On The Grind Entertainment. It is featured guest appearances from Stressmatic of The Federation, P-Lo of The HBK Gang, Ocky, Uncle Murda, 4rAx, Decadez, JT The 4th, Prohoezak, Rexx Life Raj and The Click.

Track listing

Personnel
Earl Stevens – main artist
Brandt Jones – main artist
Thomas Tremaine Jackson – featured artist (tracks: 1, 7, 17)
Ocky – featured artist (tracks: 2, 8)
Paolo Rodriguez – featured artist (track 3)
JT The 4th – featured artist (track 10)
Arcale Turner – featured artist (track 11)
Leonard Carl Grant – featured artist (track 12)
4rAx – featured artist (track 13)
Faraji Wright – featured artist (track 12)
Simon McKinley – featured artist (track 19)

Charts

References

External links
Connected And Respected at iTunes

2018 albums
E-40 albums
B-Legit albums
Sick Wid It Records albums